The 1928–29 New York Americans season was the fourth season of play of the Americans. After finishing out of the playoffs in the first three seasons, the team placed second in its division to make the playoffs for the first time. The team met the New York Rangers for a two-game total-goals series. The series was won by the Rangers, the only goal an over-time goal in the second game.

Offseason

Regular season

Final standings

Record vs. opponents

Game log

Playoffs
The Americans qualified for the playoff for the first time in history.  They lost in the first round by the Rangers 1 goal to 0, or 0–1.

Player stats

Regular season
Scoring

Goaltending

Playoffs
Scoring

Goaltending

Awards and records
 Hart Trophy – Roy Worters

Transactions

See also
1928–29 NHL season

References

New York
New York
New York Americans seasons
New York Amer
New York Amer
1920s in Manhattan
Madison Square Garden